Eleonory Gilburd is an American historian. She studied at the University of Chicago and at UC Berkeley. She specializes in the history and culture of modern Russia and the Soviet Union, especially the era of the Khrushchev Thaw. Her first book To See Paris and Die: The Soviet Lives of Western Culture (Harvard, 2018) received critical acclaim and was nominated for the Pushkin Book Prize. It also won a number of academic prizes in the field of Slavic studies.

References

21st-century American historians
American women historians
University of Chicago alumni
University of California, Berkeley alumni
Living people
Year of birth missing (living people)
21st-century American women